Monoxenus bicristatus is a species of beetle in the family Cerambycidae. It was described by Stephan von Breuning in 1939.

It's 10 mm long and 4 mm wide, and its type locality is Kumasi, Ghana.

References

bicristatus
Beetles described in 1939
Taxa named by Stephan von Breuning (entomologist)